Baked ziti is a popular casserole with ziti pasta and a Neapolitan-style tomato-based sauce characteristic of Italian-American cuisine. It is a form of pasta al forno.  

Typically, the pasta is first boiled separately until it is nearly, but not completely, done.   The almost-cooked pasta is added to a tomato-based sauce.  The tomato-coated pasta is then combined with cheese, typically a mixture of ricotta, mozzarella, and parmesan.  Other ingredients can be added with the cheese, such as ground meat, sausage, mushrooms, peppers, and onions. The combined ingredients are placed in a baking dish, covered with mozzarella cheese, baked in the oven and served hot. If unavailable, ziti can be substituted with other tubular pastas such as penne or rigatoni.

See also
 Lasagne
 List of casserole dishes
 List of pasta dishes
 Pastitsio

References

Casserole dishes
Italian-American cuisine
Pasta dishes